University Avenue is a discontinuous street in west Edmonton, Alberta, Canada, partially an arterial road and partially a residential street.  It was established in the 19th century along the south edge of a series of farm lots west of the yet-to-be-incorporated town of Strathcona, causing it to run parallel with the North Saskatchewan River to the north. The farm lots later became the University of Alberta campus, which was established in 1908. In the mid 20th century, University Avenue was permanently segmented as part of traffic calming measures, including disconnecting the eastern section with 114 Street, extending Joe Morris Park, and extending the grounds of Our Lady of Mount Carmel school.

The westernmost section of University Avenue is part of a  continuous roadway that runs through Sherwood Park, Edmonton, and St. Albert that includes Wye Road, Sherwood Park Freeway, Whyte Avenue, portions of Saskatchewan Drive, Groat Road, and St. Albert Trail.

Neighbourhoods
List of neighbourhoods University Avenue runs through. In order from west to east.
Windsor Park
Belgravia
University of Alberta
McKernan
Queen Alexandra

Major intersections
This is a list of major intersecting streets, starting at the west end of University Avenue; all intersections are, at-grade.

See also 

 Transportation in Edmonton

References

Roads in Edmonton